There are several places named Saint-Alphonse, Quebec:
Saint-Alphonse, Gaspésie–Îles-de-la-Madeleine, Quebec, in Bonaventure Regional County Municipality
Saint-Alphonse-de-Granby, Quebec, in La Haute-Yamaska Regional County Municipality (formerly Saint-Alphonse)
Saint-Alphonse-Rodriguez, Quebec, in Matawinie Regional County Municipality